Roland Cloud is a subscription based collection of VST instruments and 'RVR' sample libraries launched in early 2018 by Roland. Instrument downloads and installation are handled by Roland's Cloud Manager software.

There are features to the software versions of hardware synthesizers that were not available in the originals, thanks to the feedback of the users over the years, Roland have been able to develop this.

Roland Cloud Manager
Roland Cloud Manager manages your instrument library and sound sources and is auto updating by default.

Concerto
Concerto is a plugin which allows the usage of Roland's RVR format instruments. These instruments include the FLAVR series as well as the Tera Series and others.

Platforms
Roland Cloud Manager is available for both PC and MAC and requires a 64-bit DAW.

Subscription model and pricing

Based on a subscription model, as of January 2020, users pay $19.95 USD per month to access the catalogue of instruments (£18.5 GBP, €21 EUR or ¥2190 JPY), with discounts for committing to 12, 24 or 60 months at a time (12%, 27% and 33% off respectively).

According to the FAQs, an internet connection is required at least once per month in order to authenticate plugins in Roland Cloud.

Instruments

Aira
 System-1
 System-8

Flavr
 Blip Blop
 Electrode
 Funky Fever
 Grit
 Resin
 Sector-7 (formally  Midnight and has new effects added to it) 
 Sugar
 Trapped

Legendary
 D-50
 Jupiter-8
 Juno-106
 JV-1080
 JX-3P
 Promars
 SH-2
 SH-101
 Sound Canvas VA
 SRX Keyboards
 SRX Orchestra
 SRX World
 SRX Dance Trax
 SRX Studio
 System 100
 TB-303
 TR-606
 TR-808
 TR-909
 XV-5080

Tera
 Tera Guitar
 Tera Piano

Anthology
 1985 (vol 1 and 2) - Ultra deep sampled instrument
 1986 - Ultra deep sampled instrument
 1987 - Ultra deep sampled instrument
 1990 - Ultra deep sampled instrument
 1993 (vol 1, 2 and 3) - Ultra deep sampled instrument
 Anthology EP14 - Ultra deep sampled instrument Electric piano
 Anthology Orchestra (vol 1, 2, 3 and 4) - Ultra deep sampled instrument Orchestra

Drums
 Acoustic One
 TR-606
 TR-808
 TR-909

Patches
Patches are available for a number of the Roland Cloud instruments. These are additional configurations of the instruments.
 D-50 "Beyond Fantasia" Bank One
 D-50 "Beyond Fantasia" Bank Two
 Juno-106 Brothertiger
 Juno-106 Dark Techno
 Juno-106 New Tech
 Juno-106 Synth-Pop by Espen Kraft
 Juno-106 Synthwave
 Juno-106 Techno
 Jupiter-8 Brothertiger
 Jupiter-8 Epic Jupiter
 Jupiter-8 Synthwave
 Jupiter-8 Techno
 JV-1080 Cinematic Cyberpunk
 JV-1080 Don Solaris Signature Collection
 JV-1080 Widescreen Ambient
 JX-3P Synthwave
 JX-3P Synthwave
 Promars Curiority Collection
 SH-2 Brothertiger
 SH-2 Space Aged
 SH-101 Dark Dream Techno
 SH-101 Techno
 System-8 Frontiers
 System-8 Modern System
 System-8 Synthwave
 System-100 Klang
 TB-303 Rob Acid TB-303 Collection
 TB-303 Techno
 TR-808 Dark Techno
 TR-808 Dynamix II
 TR-808 Techno
 TR-909 Dark Techno
 TR-909 Techno
 XV-5080 Sky House

References

Software synthesizers
Audio software
Music technology